Hokimate Pamela Harwood is a New Zealand Māori ornithologist. She is a member of the Ngāpuhi iwi, and a bicultural science researcher at the Museum of New Zealand Te Papa Tongarewa.

Biography 
Harwood attended secondary school at the Catholic Regional College in Traralgon in Victoria, Australia. She then completed a Bachelor of Science degree in Biological Sciences and Physical Anthropology at the University of Auckland in New Zealand, graduating in 1998. In 2002, she completed a Master’s degree in Environmental and Marine science, also at the University of Auckland. Her thesis research analyzed the tree fruit diet of New Zealand’s pigeon population (also known as kūkupa or kererū) in the urban environment of North Shore.

Harwood's research at Te Papa focuses on the feathers in kahu huruhuru (feather cloaks). She developed a technique which uses microscopic photography to identify the bird species and geographic origin of feathers used in cloaks. She has identified the feathers in all of the cloaks in Te Papa's collection.

She also studies the historical artifacts from the Māori people of New Zealand. In 2019, Harwood was involved with the study of Te Rā, the sole remaining customary Māori sail, which is held in the collection of the British Museum in London. She was able to identify which species of birds the feathers in the sail were from.

References

External links 
 

Ngāpuhi people
Living people
University of Auckland alumni
Year of birth missing (living people)
Women ornithologists
New Zealand biologists
New Zealand Māori academics
New Zealand Māori women academics
New Zealand women academics